Funware, a term coined by Gabe Zichermann, is the use of game mechanics in non-game contexts to encourage desired user actions and generate customer loyalty. Funware typically employs game mechanics such as points, leaderboards, badges, challenges and levels.

Funware is employed online in websites such as eBay and Facebook as well as in application software such as MyTown and offline activities such as the accumulation of points and leveling up in frequent flyer programs. Websites increasingly use gamification software services such as UserInfuser to increase user engagement.

References

Behavioral economics
Gaming